A recreation area is a type of protected area designated in some jurisdictions.

By country

Canada
In the province of British Columbia, recreation areas are lands set aside for recreational use. These lands are also being evaluated to determine whether the area should be "upgraded" to full protected area status, or returned to integrated resource management lands.

United States
In the United States, National Recreation Areas are administered by several different agencies. They typically do not meet the strict guidelines to become national parks.

In U.S. state park systems, recreation areas may also fail to meet some criteria to be designated state parks, such as having multiple non-contiguous properties. Size is not necessarily a defining criterion. For instance, in Michigan, the largest state recreation area, Waterloo Recreation Area is  while the smallest state park is the  Tri-Centennial State Park and Harbor.

References

Outdoor recreation
Protected areas